The name In-fa has been used for two tropical cyclones in the Western Pacific Ocean. In-fa replaced "Parma", which was retired after the 2009 Pacific typhoon season. The name was contributed by Macau, and means fireworks.

 Typhoon In-fa (2015) (T1526, 27W, Marilyn) – Category 4 typhoon, churned in the open ocean
 Typhoon In-fa (2021) (T2106, 09W, Fabian)  – Category 2 typhoon, made landfalls in the Putuo District of Zhoushan and Pinghu, China

Pacific typhoon set index articles